Clifford Corporation was a listed Australian company that purchased several bus manufacturing businesses in the mid-1990s before collapsing in November 1998.

History
In August 1995 Clifford Corporation purchased the Ansair bus bodybuilding business from Ansett Transport Industries. This was followed by the Austral Pacific Group which comprised the Austral Denning and PMC Australia businesses.

The business collapsed in November 1998 with several of the company's office holders prosecuted.

References

Defunct companies of Australia
1995 establishments in Australia
1998 disestablishments in Australia
Australian companies established in 1995